Akchakhan-Kala, or Akcha-khan Kala, also named after the locality Kazakly-Yatkan/ Kazakl'i-Yatkan, in modern Karakalpakstan, Uzbekistan, was an ancient fortress in Chorasmia built in the 4th/ 3rd century BCE and occupied until it was despoiled in the 2nd century CE. It is part of the "Fifty fortresses oasis" in modern-day Uzbekistan. The abandonment of Akchakhan-Kala was apparently followed by the establishment of the new capital of Toprak-Kala, 14 km to the northeast.

Excavations
Akcha-khan Kala has been the object of numerous excavations, still ongoing. A ceremonial complex with a hypostyle hall was discovered.

Paintings
Many decorations have been found, belonging to the period from the 1st century BCE to the 2nd century CE: a large quantity of frescoes, unbaked-clay modelled sculptures including fragments of a Ketos in Hellenistic style, and a Zoroastrian fire altar with paintings of colossal Avestan gods. Parthian artistic influences have also been described.

References

External links
 Excavations of Kazakl'i-yatkan (Akchakhan-Kala)

Central Asia
Archaeology of Iran
Archaeological sites in Uzbekistan
Former populated places in Uzbekistan
Kushan Empire